Syrinx  is a monospecific  genus of large sea snails with a gill and an operculum, marine gastropod mollusks in the family Turbinellidae.

Distribution
This marine species can be found along the coasts of northern and western half of Australia and adjacent areas, including eastern Indonesia and Papua New Guinea

Species
 Syrinx aruanus (Linnaeus, 1758)
 Syrinx buccinoidea Röding, 1798 (nomen dubium)
 Species brought into synonymy 
 Syrinx annulata Röding, 1798: synonym of  Pustulatirus annulatus (Röding, 1798)
 Syrinx marmorata Röding, 1798: synonym of  Fusinus nicobaricus (Röding, 1798)
 Syrinx nicobaricus Röding, 1798: synonym of  Fusinus nicobaricus (Röding, 1798)
 Syrinx producta Röding, 1798: synonym of  Fusinus longissimus (Gmelin, 1791)

References

 Harasewych M.G. & Petit R.E. (1989). The nomenclatural status and phylogenetic affinities of Syrinx aruanus Linné 1758 (Prosobranchia: Turbinellidae). The Nautilus 103(2):83-84
  John D. Taylor and Emily A. Glover, Food of giants – field observations on the diet of Syrinx aruanus (Linnaeus, 1758) (Turbinellidae), the largest living gastropod; F. E. Wells, D. I. Walker and D. S. Jones (eds.) 2003. The Marine Flora and Fauna of Dampier, Western Australia, Western Australian Museum, Perth

External links
 Röding, P. F. (1798). Museum Boltenianum sive Catalogus cimeliorum e tribus regnis naturæ quæ olim collegerat Joa. Fried Bolten, M. D. p. d. per XL. annos proto physicus Hamburgensis. Pars secunda continens Conchylia sive Testacea univalvia, bivalvia & multivalvia. Hamburg: Trapp. viii, 199 pp.
 Lyons W.G. & Snyder M.A. (2019). Reassignments to the genus Marmorofusus Snyder & Lyons, 2014 (Neogastropoda: Fasciolariidae: Fusininae) of species from the Red Sea, Indian Ocean, and southwestern Australia. Zootaxa. 4714(1): 1-64

Monotypic gastropod genera
Turbinellidae